WJVL (99.9 FM) is a country music-formatted radio station licensed to Janesville, Wisconsin, and serving the areas of Janesville and Madison, Wisconsin and Rockford, Illinois. The station is owned by Benjamin Thompson and describes itself as playing "Top 40 country mixed with country golds."

History

In 1947, WCLO-FM went on the air as the sister station to WCLO. WCLO-FM was Wisconsin's first network FM station. It later became WJVL. After some years as "Music of your Life", WJVL changed to a country format in 1982.

WJVL's tower is located on N. Roherty Road between Janesville and Evansville, Wisconsin.

WJVL & WCLO are owned and operated by Benjamin Thompson.

References

External links

JVL
Country radio stations in the United States
Radio stations established in 1947
1947 establishments in Wisconsin